Paul Mebus (9 June 1920 –  11 December 1993) was a German footballer.

He was part of the West German team that won the 1954 FIFA World Cup. He earned six caps for West Germany and played twice for the German 'B-team'. During his club career he played for VfL 06 Benrath and 1. FC Köln.

Mebus was playing both as an inside forward and as a half back. In the latter role, he was considered to be one of the best in German football during the 1950s. Although he was a technically sound player, he failed to become a regular for West Germany mostly because his fitness was not the best. For Germany, he mostly played as a left half back, a position in which he had strong competition in Karl Mai. His only game in the 1954 FIFA World Cup was in the 3–8 defeat to Hungary. After that game West German coach Sepp Herberger caught Mebus singing under the shower. In face of the harsh defeat, this was unacceptable to Herberger and Mebus was not called up again by Herberger in the coming years.

Mebus finished his career in 1956. Afterwards he started coaching SV Troisdorf 05 SC Euskirchen and SV Schlebusch in the 1960s as well as Tura Hennef, TuS Höhenhaus and Eitorf 09 in the 1970s. He died in 1993.

References

1920 births
1993 deaths
Footballers from Düsseldorf
German footballers
Germany international footballers
Germany B international footballers
1. FC Köln players
1954 FIFA World Cup players
FIFA World Cup-winning players
Association football midfielders
West German footballers